Businga is a town in Nord-Ubangi Province of north-western Democratic Republic of the Congo. It is the administrative center of the territory of the same name. In 2009 it had an estimated population of 32,584.

Topography
Businga is located on the Mongala River, approximately 120 miles northeast of its confluence with the Congo River. 6 miles further to the east, the Mongala River bifurcates into the Ebola River to the north – the namesake of the deadly Ebola virus.

References

Populated places in Nord-Ubangi